The 2000–01 NBA season was the Clippers' 31st season in the National Basketball Association, and their 17th season in Los Angeles. After finishing with the worst record the previous season, the Clippers selected high school basketball star Darius Miles with the third overall pick in the 2000 NBA draft. During the off-season, the team acquired second-year guard Corey Maggette and top draft pick Keyon Dooling from the Orlando Magic, while acquiring Sean Rooks from the Dallas Mavericks. With the addition of Miles, Maggette and Dooling, along with first round draft pick Quentin Richardson, the Clippers were a young team. However, center Keith Closs was suspended for the entire season due to lack of physical conditioning. Under new head coach Alvin Gentry, the Clippers would struggle losing 14 of their first 19 games as Tyrone Nesby was traded to the Washington Wizards after 14 games. As the season progressed, the Clippers went on a nine-game losing streak in January. However, they would play around .500 in the final three months of the season, as they doubled their previous season's win total finishing sixth in the Pacific Division with a 31–51 record.

Second-year star Lamar Odom had a strong season averaging 17.2 points, 7.8 rebounds, 5.2 assists and 1.6 blocks per game, while Jeff McInnis averaged 12.9 points and 5.5 assists per game, and Miles provided the team with 9.4 points, 5.9 rebounds and 1.5 blocks per game off the bench, and was named to the NBA All-Rookie First Team. Three-point specialist Eric Piatkowski provided with 10.6 points per game, while Maggette contributed 10.0 points per game off the bench, and Michael Olowokandi averaged 8.5 points, 6.4 rebounds and 1.3 blocks per game.

For the season, the Clippers changed their uniforms by adding side panels to their jerseys and shorts, which remained in use until 2010.

Draft picks

Roster

Roster Notes
 Center Sean Rooks and power forward Derek Strong both became the 8th, and 9th former Lakers to play for the crosstown rival Clippers.
 Center Keith Closs was suspended indefinitely due to lack of physical conditioning.

Regular season

Season standings

Record vs. opponents

Game log

Player statistics

Player Statistics Citation:

Awards, records and milestones

Awards

Week/Month

All-Star
 Corey Maggette participated in the NBA Slam Dunk Contest during NBA All Star Weekend.  This makes him only the second Clipper player to compete in the Slam Dunk Contest.

Season

Records

Milestones

Transactions
The Clippers have been involved in the following transactions during the 2000-01 season.

Trades

Free Agents

Additions

Subtractions

Player Transactions Citation:

See also
 2000-01 NBA season

References

Los Angeles Clippers seasons